Luiz Gustavo Novaes Palhares (born 20 February 1998), commonly known as Luizão, is a Brazilian professional footballer who plays as a midfielder for Polish club Radomiak Radom.

Club career
Luizão transferred from São Paulo FC to FC Porto in July 2017.

In 2019, Luizão went on loan from FC Porto to Vorskla Poltava.

In September 2021, Luizão joined Bahia on loan from Vorskla Poltava, where he played six matches in the Campeonato Brasileiro Série A. His contract with Bahia, due to expire in December 2022, was terminated in February 2022.

On 18 February 2022, Luizão signed a contract with Radomiak Radom in Poland until 30 June 2025.

References

External links

 
 

1998 births
Living people
Brazilian footballers
Association football midfielders
Liga Portugal 2 players
FC Porto B players
FC Vorskla Poltava players
Radomiak Radom players
Esporte Clube Bahia players
Ukrainian Premier League players
Campeonato Brasileiro Série A players
Ekstraklasa players
Brazilian expatriate footballers
Brazilian expatriate sportspeople in Portugal
Brazilian expatriate sportspeople in Ukraine
Brazilian expatriate sportspeople in Poland
Expatriate footballers in Portugal
Expatriate footballers in Ukraine
Expatriate footballers in Poland
Footballers from São Paulo